Hadi Al Abbas (born 29 November 1985) is a Saudi Arabian football player who plays as a midfielder.

External links 
 

1985 births
Living people
Khaleej FC players
Al-Taraji Club players
Saudi Arabian footballers
Saudi First Division League players
Saudi Professional League players
Saudi Second Division players
Association football midfielders
Saudi Arabian Shia Muslims